HMS Express is an  P2000-type patrol and training vessel of the Royal Navy.

Initially assigned to the Royal Naval Auxiliary Service, her hull was black rather than the grey colour normally used for Royal Navy warships. On transfer to the Royal Navy she retained the black colour until 2005. She is assigned to the Wales  University Royal Naval Unit (URNU) from Cardiff, Swansea and South Wales Universities. The students are given the rank of officer cadet in the Royal Navy Reserve.

Up to 10 students from Wales URNU can be accommodated on board, as well as 5 permanent ships company drawn from the Royal Navy.

Notes

References

External links

 

 

Archer-class patrol vessels
1988 ships